Sigurd Holemark (8 September 1934 in Norderhov – 12 August 2004) was a Norwegian politician for the Conservative Party (Høyre). He was a member of the Parliament of Norway from 1981 to 1993, representing Østfold.

See also
Politics of Norway

References

1934 births
2004 deaths
People from Ringerike (municipality)
Conservative Party (Norway) politicians
Members of the Storting
Østfold politicians
20th-century Norwegian politicians